Energy weapon may refer to:

Directed-energy weapon, real-life energy weapons used in the military
Raygun, fictional gun-type energy weapons
Energy sword, fictional sword-type energy weapons
Force field (technology), fictional shield-type energy weapons